The 1988 North Star Conference Women's Volleyball Tournament was held at the ? in DeKalb, Illinois. The tournament began on November 19, 1988, and ended on November 20, 1988.

North Star Conference standings

1988 North Star Conference Tournament
November 19, 1988 Valparaiso 3, Cleveland State 1
November 19, 1988 Cleveland State 3, DePaul 2
November 19, 1988 Northern Illinois 3, Cleveland State 0
November 19, 1988 Northern Illinois 3, DePaul 1
November 19, 1988 Green Bay 3, Marquette 1
November 19, 1988 Akron 3, Green Bay 2
November 19, 1988 Illinois Chicago 3, Green Bay 0
November 19, 1988 Valparaiso 3, DePaul 1
November 19, 1988 Illinois Chicago 3, Akron 1
November 19, 1988 Akron 2, Marquette 0
November 19, 1988 Northern Illinois 3, Valparaiso 0
November 20, 1988 Northern Illinois 3, Akron 0
November 20, 1988 Valparaiso 2, Akron 0
November 20, 1988 Northern Illinois 3, Illinois Chicago 0

References

North Star Conference